Hynobius sonani, the Taichu salamander, is a species of salamander in the family Hynobiidae, endemic to Taiwan, where it occurs in the Central Mountain Range above . Its natural habitats are from open alpine habitats to shaded moist evergreen forests; it breeds in streams.

The original specimens used to describe H. sonani (along with H. arisanensis and H. formosanus) were lost in the 1923 Great Kantō earthquake.

Hynobius sonani has very fragmented distribution and is threatened by habitat loss, mainly caused by the development of infrastructure for tourism. It is present in Taroko National Park.

See also
List of protected species in Taiwan
List of endemic species of Taiwan

References

sonani
Amphibians described in 1922
Endemic fauna of Taiwan
Amphibians of Taiwan
Taxonomy articles created by Polbot
Endangered Fauna of China